Tontini is an Italian surname. Notable people with the surname include:

 Felipe Tontini da Silveira (born 1995), Brazilian footballer
 Ferro Tontini (born 1969), Italian footballer

Italian-language surnames